Tetanocera arrogans is a species of fly in the family Sciomyzidae. It is found in the  Palearctic The larva feeds on Succinea putris and other aquatic or semiaquatic snails.

References

External links
Images representing Tetanocera arrogans at BOLD
Ecology of Commanster

Sciomyzidae
Insects described in 1830
Diptera of Europe